Catholic Community Services is a ministry of the Roman Catholic Diocese of Salt Lake City that operates various programs in Salt Lake City and Ogden designed to provide help and create hope for those impacted by homelessness as food insecurity. CCS' Migration and Refugee Services department also equips and empower immigrants and refugees settling into the life in the United States.  Its mission is to practice gospel values of love, compassion, and hope through service, support, and collaboration. It is a member of the National organization Catholic Charities. Its Main Office is located at 224 North 2200 West 
Salt Lake City, Utah.

History
Catholic Community Services (CCS) was established in 1945 when Most Rev. Duane G. Hunt of the Catholic Diocese of Salt Lake City recognized the need for an organized effort to assist the poor. He established a local branch of the Catholic Charities. A tiny office was opened on the upper floor of the red brick house next to the Cathedral of the Madeleine. Msgr. Joseph P. Moreton, the first Executive Director, implemented various programs including: adoption, foster care, family counseling, supplementary aid and transient relief. CCS has expanded to include four sites that deliver basic social services to those in need along the Wasatch Front and Northern Utah over the last 75 years.

Programs
Through two departments, Basic Needs and Migration & Refugee Services, CCS currently delivers a comprehensive array of services.

Migration & Refugee Services
Refugee Resettlement provides hundreds of refugees the assistance they need to recover from lives dismantled by conflict and disaster and to create lives they love. Our experienced staff offers clients a variety of services including case management, job placement, health services, interpretation, transportation, housing, food assistance, and more in an effort to empower clients to reach self-sufficiency. CCS of Utah is an affiliate of the United States Conference of Catholic Bishops, and of the Office of Migration and Refugee Services.
 The Immigration program provides full legal representation to immigrants and refugees as they upgrade their immigration status. CCS also provides consultations to immigrants, refugees, and  U.S. citizens who have questions about immigration laws, procedures, and basic eligibility. Services are available in both Salt Lake City and Ogden.
Through CCS, unaccompanied refugee minors are placed in foster care homes and have the option to stay in the program until they turn 21. While in the program, a team of Family Consultants, Case Managers, and Transition to Adult Living Coaches work with foster families to help the youth reach their goals and prepare for long-term self-sufficiency.

Basic Needs
Salt Lake City
St. Vincent de Paul Dining Hall serves two meals from the center daily. The facility also caters two meals daily to six other local Homeless Services Providers in the area, amassing over 2,000 meals a day.
The Weigand Homeless Resource Center is the only day shelter of its kind in Salt Lake City. The center not only provides clients with daytime shelter, but also a variety of resources including case management, a computer lab to search for employment and benefit programs, showering and laundry facilities, and a number of in-house partnerships to provide clients with additional resources.
Due to COVID-19, the opening of St. Vincent’s Kitchen Academy has been delayed. The program will launch when it is once again safe for both staff and clients. Throughout the program, clients will be equipped with both culinary and life skills. Clients will also be offered case management services for housing and employment, as well as experiential learning opportunities through an externship and assistance in job placement.
Ogden
The Joyce Hansen Hall Food Bank and Pantry gathers and distributes food resources to those who need it most in our grocery store style facility. Volunteers deliver boxes of food to those who are homebound, elderly, and disabled. The pantry also assists clients with hygiene products, infant formula and diapers, and other household items.
Bridging the Gap is a mobile food distribution program that visits low-income elementary schools in Ogden and Weber School Districts each Friday. Students are given two bags of healthy, easy-to-prepare meals and snacks to sustain them through the weekend.
St. Martha’s Baby Project assists and empowers new mothers by providing essential supplies and services as they enter into motherhood. The center provides new mothers in need with newborn layettes, case management services, as well as support group services.

See also
Charitable organization
Poverty
Social services
Social problems

Notes

External links
ccsutah.org

Social welfare charities based in the United States
Organizations based in Utah